Cross Country is the debut studio album by American musician Breland. It was released through Bad Realm Records and Atlantic Records on September 9, 2022. The album features guest artists Keith Urban, Mickey Guyton, Thomas Rhett, Ingrid Andress and Lady A.

Cross Country marks as Breland's full-length album release following after his 2020 EPs: Breland and Rage & Sorrow.

Background
The album was initially hinted for a June 2022 release.

Promotion
The title track and lead single "Cross Country" was released on February 26, 2021 with a music video. An updated version featuring Mickey Guyton was released three weeks later on March 19, 2021. The Mickey Guyton version appears on the album instead of the original.

"Throw It Back" featuring Keith Urban was released on June 4, 2021, and serves as the second single from the album. Breland and Urban previously collaborated on "Out the Cage" from Urban's 2020 album ''The Speed of Now Part 1.

"Praise the Lord" was released as the third single on March 7, 2022 and features Thomas Rhett. It debuted at number 100 on the Billboard 200.

The album's fourth single, "Natural" was released on June 14, 2022.

Breland released "Told You I Could Drink" featuring Lady A on August 5, 2022 as the album's fifth single.

"For What It's Worth" and its music video was released on the same day as the album on September 9, 2022, and was Breland's first single to impact country radio on October 17, 2022.

Track listing

Sample credits
"County Line" contains an interpolation of "Nobody", performed by Sylvia.
"Natural" contains an interpolation of "Man! I Feel Like a Woman!", performed by Shania Twain.

Charts

Release history

References

2022 debut albums
Breland (musician) albums
Atlantic Records albums
Country albums by American artists